Christian Charles Tyler Doll (22 March 1880 – 5 April 1955) was an English first-class cricketer and a prominent architect at the ancient site of Knossos in Crete.

Early life and cricket
The son of the architect Charles Fitzroy Doll and his wife, Emily Francis Tyler, he was born at Kensington in March 1880. He was educated at Charterhouse School, before going up to Trinity College, Cambridge in 1898. He made his debut in first-class cricket for the Marylebone Cricket Club (MCC) against Cambridge University in 1900, with Doll making five appearances for the MCC in that season. The following season he made a single appearance in first-class cricket for Cambridge University against London County at Crystal Palace. He continued to play first-class cricket for the MCC until 1904, making a total of 28 appearances. He scored 747 runs for the MCC, at an average of 21.97, with a high score of 224 not out. This score, which was one of two centuries he made, came against London County in 1901. In addition to playing first-class cricket, he also played minor counties cricket for Hertfordshire from 1901–09, making nineteen appearances in the Minor Counties Championship.

Architectural career
After graduating from Cambridge in 1901, Doll attended University College London where he studied for architectural diploma. He was present at the British School of Archaeology at Athens in 1904. He was the architect to British excavations at Knossos in Crete, replacing Theodore Fyfe, and was partly responsible for the reconstruction of the grand staircase at the Palace of King Minos, working alongside Arthur Evans. He served as the mayor of Holborn in 1951. Doll died in April 1955 at Meldreth, Cambridgeshire. His brother, Mordaunt, also played first-class cricket.

References

External links

1880 births
1955 deaths
Sportspeople from Kensington
People educated at Charterhouse School
Alumni of Trinity College, Cambridge
Alumni of University College London
English cricketers
Marylebone Cricket Club cricketers
Cambridge University cricketers
Hertfordshire cricketers
Architects from London